The Whoop-Up Trail, also known as the Macleod-Benton Trail was a wagon road that connected Fort Benton, Montana, to Fort Hamilton, Alberta.

The trail was initially a trade route between Montana and the southern region of Alberta, which was then known as Rupert's Land and originally controlled by the Hudson's Bay Company. In 1869, negotiations were taking place to transfer political control to Canada. Several American traders took advantage of lack of policing in the area and set up trading posts. In addition to their usual trade with the Blackfeet of goods such as guns, metal implements and blankets, they began trading adulterated alcohol known as "firewater". Several posts were established and one of the earliest was Fort Hamilton, in 1869, which burnt down and was replaced by another in 1870, near Lethbridge, Alberta, which later became known as Fort Whoop-Up. This trade continued until the arrival of the North-West Mounted Police, in October 1874, when it was considerably curtailed by their establishment of Fort Macleod. After that, the Whoop Up trail continued to be the main supply route from Fort Benton into the north for more legitimate goods. The arrival of the railways in the 1880s ended its usefulness.

See also 
 Rocky Springs Segment of the Whoop-Up Trail
 Froggie's Stopping Place on the Whoop-Up Trail

References 

Military roads
Historic trails and roads in Montana
Historic trails and roads in Alberta
International road networks
Canada–United States border crossings
Trails and roads in the American Old West